Bayley Elizabeth Feist (born March 14, 1997) is an American soccer midfielder who currently plays for the Washington Spirit in the National Women's Soccer League (NWSL).

Early life

Wake Forest Demon Deacons
Feist attended Wake Forest University, where she played for the Demon Deacons women's soccer team from 2015 to 2018. Starting in all games after her sophomore year, Feist made the All-ACC Third Team in 2017 and the All-ACC Second Team in 2018. At the time of her graduation, her 22 career goals were tied for 10th-most in school history.

Club career

Washington Spirit
Feist was drafted 17th overall in the second round of the 2019 NWSL College Draft by the Washington Spirit. In April, she was signed to the Spirit's supplemental roster in advance of the 2019 NWSL season. Feist made her first professional appearance on May 4, 2019, as an 80th-minute substitute in Washington's 0–0 draw against Reign FC.

References

External links
 Washington Spirit player profile
 Soccerway player profile

1997 births
Living people
American women's soccer players
Wake Forest Demon Deacons women's soccer players
National Women's Soccer League players
Soccer players from Ohio
Washington Spirit draft picks
Washington Spirit players
Women's association football midfielders